Pseudoellimma gallae is an extinct species of clupeiform fish which existed in the Coqueiro Seco Formation, Brazil during the early Cretaceous period. It was described by Francisco J. De Figueiredo in 2009, in a new genus, Pseudoellimma.

References

Clupeiformes
Early Cretaceous fish
Prehistoric fish of South America
Early Cretaceous animals of South America
Cretaceous Brazil
Fossils of Brazil
Fossil taxa described in 2009